Grida Dance is performed in a few villages of India.

When the rabi crops are ready, villagers get together and perform the Grida dance to celebrate their hard work, the ritual continuing from morning until evening.

References

Dances of India
Culture of Madhya Pradesh